Mitrinović is a Serbian surname. Notable people with the surname include:

Dimitrije Mitrinović (1887–1953), Serbian philosopher, poet, revolutionary, mystic, theoretician of modern painting, traveller and cosmopolite.
Dragoslav Mitrinović (1908–1995), Serbian mathematician

See also
Mitrović, a surname

Serbian surnames